Donald McRae may refer to:

Don McRae (cricketer) (1914–1986), New Zealand cricketer and football (soccer) international
Don McRae (politician) (born 1969/1970), Canadian politician
Donald McRae (Australian cricketer) (1873-1940), Australian cricketer
Donald McRae (author) (born 1961), South African sports writer
Donald Malcolm McRae (born 1944), Canadian legal scholar

See also
Donald MacRae (disambiguation)